The 1983 World Table Tennis Championships – Corbillon Cup (women's team) was the 30th edition of the women's team championship.

China won the gold medal defeating Japan 3–0 in the final, North Korea won the bronze medal.

Medalists

Final tables

Group A

Group B

Semifinals

Third-place playoff

Final

See also
List of World Table Tennis Championships medalists

References

-
1983 in women's table tennis